The Blacksmith is a 1922 American short comedy film co-written, co-directed by and featuring Buster Keaton. Buster plays an assistant blacksmith to the big worker played by Joe Roberts, with predictable results.

Cast

 Buster Keaton as Blacksmith's assistant
 Joe Roberts as Blacksmith
 Virginia Fox as Horsewoman

Alternate versions
In June 2013, Argentine film collector, curator and historian Fernando Martín Peña (who had previously unearthed the complete version of Metropolis) discovered an alternate version of this film, a sort of remake whose last reel differs completely from the previously known version. Film historians have since found evidence that the version of The Blacksmith Peña uncovered was a substantial reshoot undertaken months after completion of principal photography and a preview screening in New York. They now believe the rediscovered version was Keaton's final cut intended for wide distribution.

Following Peña's discovery, a third version of the film, featuring at least one scene which doesn't occur in either of the other two, was found in the collection of former film distributor Blackhawk Films.

See also
 Buster Keaton filmography

References

External links
 
 
 The Blacksmith at the International Buster Keaton Society
 The Blacksmith at Famous Clowns

1922 films
1922 short films
1922 comedy films
Films directed by Buster Keaton
Films directed by Malcolm St. Clair
American silent short films
American black-and-white films
Silent American comedy films
First National Pictures films
Films produced by Joseph M. Schenck
Films with screenplays by Buster Keaton
1920s American films